Ceratina smaragdula, also known as Ceratina (Pithitis) smaragdula, is a species of green metallic bees belonging to the family Apidae, subfamily Xylocopinae.

References

External links
 Photo on Flickr
 Academia.edu
 Animaldiversity.org

smaragdula
Insects described in 1787